Myaing Hay Wun Elephant Park is a small wildlife park of Burma. It is located in Taikkyi Township in Yangon Division.

Protected areas of Myanmar
Protected areas established in 1986
1986 establishments in Burma